Once More with Feeling is a 2009 American independent direct-to-video comedy-drama film written by Gina O'Brien and directed by Jeff Lipsky and starring Chazz Palminteri, Drea de Matteo and  Linda Fiorentino.

Plot summary
A man pursues his old dream of becoming a singer by performing karaoke.

Cast  
 
 Chazz Palminteri as  Frank Gregorio
 Drea de Matteo as Lana Gregorio
 Linda Fiorentino as Lydia
 Lauren Bittner as Susan
 Maria Tucci as Angelina Gregorio
 Daisy Tahan as Chloe
 Gene Ruffini as Nonno 
 David Aaron Baker as Rich 
 Chris Beetem as  Officer Murphy 
 David Call as Kevin 
 Angelica Boccella  as Nancy 
 Venida Evans as Lucille

References

External links

2009 comedy-drama films
American comedy-drama films
American independent films
2009 independent films
2009 films
2000s English-language films
2000s American films